The following is a timeline of the history of the city of Alexandria, Virginia, USA.

Prior to 20th century

 1749 - Alexandria founded.
 1752 - Carlyle House (residence) built.
 1754 - Fairfax County courthouse built.
 1773 - Christ Church consecrated.
 1779 - Town of Alexandria incorporated.
 1784 - Virginia Journal and Alexandria Advertiser begins publication.
 1788 - Alexandria Lodge No.22 established.
 1789 - Town "ceded to the federal government."
 1790
 Presbyterian Meeting House built.
 Population: 2,748.
 1792
 Bank of Alexandria established.
 Stabler Apothecary in business.
 1794
 Gadsby's Tavern in business.
 Alexandria Library founded.
 1801 - Alexandria becomes part of the District of Columbia.
 1817 - Market House built.
 1818 - St. Paul's Episcopal Church consecrated.
 1823 - Virginia Theological Seminary founded. 
 1825 - Hallowell School opens.
 1828 - Franklin and Armfield slave traders in business.
 1830 - Population: 8,241.
 1833 - St. John's Academy established.
 1834 - Alexandria Gazette newspaper in publication.
 1839
 Lyceum built.
 Episcopal High School founded.
 1840 - Population: 8,459.
 1843 - Alexandria Canal to Georgetown opens.
 1847 - March 20: Alexandria becomes part of Virginia again.
 1852 - City of Alexandria incorporated.
 1860 - Population: 12,652.
 1863 - August: Alexandria becomes seat of Restored Government of Virginia.
 1865 - Convention of the Colored People of Virginia held in city.
 1870 - City becomes independent of Alexandria County.
 1873 - Alexandria City Hall rebuilt.

20th century

 1906 - Union Station built.
 1930 - Potomac becomes part of city.
 1932 - George Washington Masonic National Memorial built.
 1937 - Alexandria Free Public Library opens.
 1940 - Robinson Library and Vernon Theatre open.
 1945 - Centre Theatre built.
 1946 - Old Town Alexandria historic district established.
 1952 - Part of Fairfax County annexed to city.
 1954 - Historic Alexandria Foundation chartered.
 1961
 Woodrow Wilson Bridge opens.
 Frank E. Mann becomes mayor.
 1967 - Charles E. Beatley becomes mayor.
 1974 - Torpedo Factory Art Center opens.
 1975
 Alexandria Packet newspaper begins publication.
 City archaeological commission formed.
 1976 - Gadsby's Tavern museum opens.
 1983
 Washington Metro King Street–Old Town station, Braddock Road station, and Eisenhower Avenue station open.
 Gifts in Kind International headquartered in Alexandria.
 1985
 Vola Lawson becomes city manager, the first woman to hold the position.
 Jim Moran becomes mayor.
 1991
 Van Dorn Street station opens.
 Patsy Ticer becomes mayor.
 1996
 City website online.
 Kerry J. Donley becomes mayor.

21st century

 2003 - William D. Euille becomes mayor.
 2005 - United States Patent and Trademark Office headquartered in city.
 2010 - Population: 139,966.
 2015 - Don Beyer becomes U.S. representative for Virginia's 8th congressional district.
 2016 - Allison Silberberg becomes mayor.
 2017
 June 14: Congressional baseball shooting occurs.
 The National Science Foundation relocates their headquarters to the Eisenhower Valley neighborhood from Arlington.
 2019
 Justin Wilson becomes mayor.
 Construction begins on Potomac Yard station, slated to the be the fifth Washington Metro station in the city,
 2020 - Population reaches 159,467.
 2022 - Landmark Mall is demolished as work begins on its redevelopment.

See also
 History of Alexandria, Virginia
 National Register of Historic Places listings in Alexandria, Virginia
 List of mayors of Alexandria, Virginia
 History of Virginia
 Timeline of Washington, D.C.
 Timelines of other cities in Virginia: Hampton, Lynchburg, Newport News, Norfolk, Portsmouth, Richmond, Roanoke, Virginia Beach

References

Bibliography

External links

Alexandria